Mississippi Snake Grabbers is a Canadian reality television series on CMT that follows a group of six men, all in law enforcement, from rural Scott County, Mississippi, who fish for snakes in Lake Washington.  Amazon Prime streamed twelve full episodes where the show maintained five stars.  The (Grabuone Outfitters) Mississippi Snake Grabbers also appeared in CMT Canada's Tornado Hunters Episode 3.

They have also appeared on Tru TV's Breaking Greenville, Almost Genius on the Science Channel, Mississippi Outdoors on Mississippi Public Broadcasting and several appearances on Look Around Mississippi with Walt Grayson. The Mississippi Snake Grabbers also host an Annual Snake Grabbing Rodeo in Greenville Mississippi every June.

References

http://www.cmt.ca/show/mississippi-snake-grabbers-2/
http://www.grabuone.com/

2015 Canadian television series debuts
2010s Canadian reality television series
Fishing television series